2012–13 Liga Portuguesa de Andebol was the 11th season of the premier Portuguese handball league, the Portuguese Handball First Division (Liga Portuguesa de Andebol). FC Porto were the champions for the year.

Results
 Sporting CP 32 - 22 Avanca
 Benfica 29 - 22 ABC
 Xico Andebol 30 - 27 Fafe
 Madeira SAD 30 - 28 Belenenses
 Sporting da Horta 27 - 26 Águas Santas
 CDE Camões 21 - 37 FC Porto

Handball in Portugal
2012–13 domestic handball leagues
2012 in Portuguese sport
2013 in Portuguese sport